SLO, or Slo, may refer to:

Places
 San Luis Obispo, a city in the state of California, US
 San Luis Obispo County, a county in the state of California, US

Medicine
 Scanning laser ophthalmoscopy, an eye examination method
 Secondary lymphoid organ, for example a lymph node or spleen
 Streptolysin O, exotoxin produced by streptococci

Transport
 Salem–Leckrone Airport (IATA code), Illinois, US
 Slough railway station (National Rail code), in the county of Berkshire, UK
 SLO Transit, a provider of mass transportation in San Luis Obispo, California, US
 Solo Balapan railway station, a railway station in Indonesia (station code)

Other uses
 Service-level objective, of a customer agreement
 SLO, a music album by Jess Mills
 Student Learning Objectives, an assessment tool used by teachers
 Supporter liaison officer, of a sports club

See also